Crossognathus is an extinct genus of prehistoric ray-finned fish.

References

Early Cretaceous fish
Cretaceous bony fish
Crossognathiformes
Prehistoric fish of Europe
Prehistoric ray-finned fish genera